is a cluster of four islands in the Inland Sea, off Wakayama, Wakayama, Japan. The islands form part of the Setonaikai National Park.

History
The islands were used by Buddhist monks for Shugendō. The folklore of the region holds that Ennogyoja, the founder of shugendo, underwent training on the steep cliffs of Tomogashima in the seventh to eighth centuries. This gave rise to the nickname of "The island of shugendo (mountain asceticism)" for Tomogashima.

Later, during the Meiji period, a brick fort and lighthouse were built. Also during this time gun batteries and other defences, along with various support facilities, were constructed to counter foreign warships. Tomogashima was a critical component of the Shusei Kokubō (守勢国防 - i.e. "Static Defence") policy of the 1870s and 1880s, which emphasised coastal defences. Access to the cluster by the public was strictly prohibited by the Imperial Japanese Army up to the end of World War II.

Depictions in art
Tomogashima is the subject of a scroll of 1661 in the Shōgo-in in Kyoto by Kanō Tan'yū as well as an anonymous work of 1798 in the British Museum. The island became the prototype for fictional Hitogashima Island in Summer Time Rendering anime and manga series.

Climate

See also
 Tomogashima Lighthouse
 Setonaikai National Park
 Imperial Japanese Navy
 List of Army Fortresses in Japan

References

External links
 Views of Tomogashima (British Museum)

Islands of Wakayama Prefecture
Forts in Japan
Coastal fortifications
Imperial Japanese Army
Empire of Japan
19th-century fortifications in Japan